Antonio Domínguez Sacramento (born 4 April 1993) is a Spanish professional footballer who plays as an attacking midfielder for GKS Tychy.

Football career
Born in Punta Umbría, Andalusia, Domínguez graduated from local Recreativo de Huelva, and made his senior debuts while on loan at lowly Olímpica Valverdeña CF. In the 2013 summer he returned to Recre and was assigned to the reserves in Tercera División; Domínguez was later called up to train with the main squad in late August.

On 11 September 2013 Domínguez first appeared for the main squad, starting in a 3–2 home win against Sporting de Gijón, for the season's Copa del Rey. He made his league debut on 13 December of the following year, coming on as a late substitute for Jesús Vázquez in a 2–4 home loss against UD Las Palmas in the Segunda División championship.

On 22 March 2015 Domínguez scored his first professional goal, netting the last in a 1–1 away draw against Sporting de Gijón. After suffering relegation, he renewed his contract and was definitely promoted to the main squad.

On 10 January 2018, Domínguez terminated his contract with Recre, and moved to fellow league team Real Valladolid B just hours later. On 14 May, he renewed his contract until 2020 and was definitely promoted to Valladolid's first team ahead of the 2018–19 campaign.

On 31 August 2018, Domínguez joined third tier team CE Sabadell FC on a season-long loan.

References

External links

1993 births
Living people
Sportspeople from the Province of Huelva
Spanish footballers
Spanish expatriate footballers
Footballers from Andalusia
Association football wingers
Segunda División players
Segunda División B players
Tercera División players
Ekstraklasa players
I liga players
Atlético Onubense players
Recreativo de Huelva players
Real Valladolid Promesas players
Real Valladolid players
CE Sabadell FC footballers
Algeciras CF footballers
ŁKS Łódź players
GKS Tychy players
Expatriate footballers in Poland
Spanish expatriate sportspeople in Poland